Burning Daylight: The Adventures of 'Burning Daylight' in Alaska is a 1914 American adventure film directed by Hobart Bosworth, starring Hobart Bosworth, Rhea Haines, J. Charles Haydon, Elmer Clifton and Jack Conway. It is based on the 1910 novel Burning Daylight by Jack London. The film was released on September 14, 1914, by Paramount Pictures.

Cast 
Hobart Bosworth as Elam Harnish
Rhea Haines as Nell
J. Charles Haydon as Elijah
Elmer Clifton as Charley Bates
Jack Conway as Joe Hines

References

External links 
 
 

1914 films
American adventure drama films
Films based on works by Jack London
Paramount Pictures films
1910s adventure drama films
American black-and-white films
American silent feature films
1914 drama films
1910s English-language films
1910s American films
Silent American drama films
Silent adventure films